Javier Gutiérrez Cuevas (born 29 March 1985 in Santander, Cantabria) is a Spanish cross-country skier who has competed since 2004. At the 2010 Winter Olympics in Vancouver, he finished 40th in the 30 km mixed pursuit, 69th in the 15 km events, and did not finish the 50 km event.

Gutierrez finished 67th in the 15 km event at the FIS Nordic World Ski Championships 2009 in Liberec.

His best World Cup finish was 19th in a 4 x 10 km relay at Norway in 2007 while his best individual finish was 61st in a 15 km event at Italy in 2009.

Olympic results

References
 

1985 births
Living people
Sportspeople from Santander, Spain
Cross-country skiers from Cantabria
Spanish male cross-country skiers
Cross-country skiers at the 2010 Winter Olympics
Cross-country skiers at the 2014 Winter Olympics
Olympic cross-country skiers of Spain